Siviwe Mpondo is a South African rugby league player for the Tuks Bulls in the Rhino Cup. His position is second row. He is a South African international, and has played in the 2013 Rugby League World Cup qualifying against Jamaica and the USA.

References

Mpondo
Mpondo
Tuks Bulls players